King Prajadhipok Museum is a museum in Pom Prap Sattru Phai District, Bangkok, Thailand. The building has three floors of permanent exhibitions relating to royal life of King Prajadhipok and Queen Rambai Barni of Thailand.

Formerly, this building is the location of the John Sampson & Son's department store, known briefly as "John Sampson", which is a branch of a shop selling tailor-made shoes and famous saddles in the area. Bond Street, London has expanded its branches to Thailand. Following the persuasion of King Chulalongkorn in the year 1898, he later ordered the construction of this building and open for rent until the company dissolved.

Subsequently, Luang Maitriwanich (Chalerm Yotmani) entered the rental of the building. Therefore changed the name to "Suthadilok Department Store" until the contract expired in the year 1933, the Department of Public Works therefore rented the office of the Department.On 26 April 2001, King Prajadhipok's Institute was transferred Museum operations from the Department of Public Works until the renovation of the building was completed in late November 2002.

His Majesty King Bhumibol Adulyadej is graciously pleased to the Crown Prince Vajiralongkorn open the Museum of King Prajadhipok and Queen Rambai Barni on 7 December 2002. The museum has a collection of King Rama VII and Queen's royal displays showing photos, documents and royal biography.

References

External links
King Prajadhipok Museum official website
King Prajadhipok Museum King Prajadhipok Museum

Museums in Bangkok